Klaudia Grzelak (born 12 February 1996) is a Polish volleyball player. She plays for LTS Legionovia Legionowo in the Orlen Liga.

Grzelak was part of the winning Polish team at the 2013 Girls' Youth European Volleyball Championship.

References

Living people
1996 births
Polish women's volleyball players
Sportspeople from Kalisz
21st-century Polish women